Bathymunida nebulosa is a species of squat lobster in the family Munididae. The specific epithet is derived from the Latin nebulosus, meaning "indefinite" or "obscure", in reference to the weak striae on the carapace.

References

Squat lobsters
Crustaceans described in 1996